Archduchess Maria Anna of Austria (Maria Anna Ferdinanda Josepha Charlotte Johanna; 21 April 1770 – 1 October 1809) was an Archduchess of Austria by birth, and a Princess-Abbess of the Theresian Institution of Noble Ladies in Prague.

Biography

Maria Anna was a daughter of Emperor Leopold II (1747–1792) and his wife Maria Luisa of Spain (1745–1792). Maria Anna was born in Florence, the capital of Tuscany, where her father reigned as Grand Duke from 1765–90. Maria Anna was her parents' fourth child among sixteen children. Her father was a son of Empress Maria Theresa and her mother a daughter of Charles III of Spain and Maria Amalia of Saxony. She had a happy childhood surrounded by her many siblings. As her siblings, Maria Anna was given a somewhat different upbringing than was usual given to royal children at the time: they were actually raised by their parents rather than a retinue of servants, were largely kept apart from any ceremonial court life and was taught to live simple, natural and modest. She became Abbess at the Theresian Convent in Prague in 1791. She traveled to Neudorf, Arad where she died on 1 October 1809, at the age of 39 years. In 1841, the emperor Ferdinand I of Austria honoring the Archduchess commissioned the funerary plaque built of Carrara marble.

Ancestors

References

Bibliography 

Austrian princesses
1770 births
1809 deaths
Daughters of emperors
Children of Leopold II, Holy Roman Emperor
Daughters of kings